is a 1966 Japanese film directed by Yasuzo Masumura. It tells the story of a young Japanese nurse on the front lines in China during the Second Sino-Japanese War. It is based on a 1966 novel of the same name by Yorichika Arima (ja).

Plot
Sakura Nishi is a Japanese nurse in China during the Second Sino-Japanese war. Initially she works in a ward of chronically ill men. She is raped by a patient, Sakamoto. She reports the rape and Sakamoto is sent to the front lines. Nishi is sent to a field hospital. The hospital is overwhelmed and has too few doctors and not enough medicine to treat all the patients. Nishi works with Doctor Okabe. Sakamoto comes in, shot in the belly and dying. Okabe refuses to provide him with a blood transfusion, reasoning that Sakamoto is beyond saving, but Nishi pleads with him. Okabe tries to save Sakamoto on condition that Nishi will come to his room that night. Sakamoto dies, but Nishi goes to Okabe's room. However, Okabe just wants to talk to Nishi and drink his French wine with her. He asks her to inject him with morphine and then sleeps. Shortly thereafter, Nishi takes pity on a man who has lost his arms, and forms a sexual relationship with him. When she puts an end to the relationship, and the man concludes that he's likely never to experience a similar relationship again, he commits suicide.

Okabe and Nishi and two other nurses are sent to a village on the front line. A comfort woman in the village has been infected with cholera and the cholera spreads to the soldiers. Okabe tries to set up hygiene, but the soldiers behave like wild animals, trying to rape the nurses. The soldiers become ill and the village cannot be defended. The Chinese Army attack the village and everyone except Nishi is killed and stripped of most of their clothing and any other valuables that the Chinese can make use of.

References

External links

1966 films
Japanese war drama films
Films directed by Yasuzo Masumura
Films about nurses
Second Sino-Japanese War films
1960s Japanese films
Japanese romantic drama films